The Panniet naked-backed fruit bat (Dobsonia pannietensis), also known as the De Vis's Bare-backed Fruit Bat and Panaeati Bare-backed Fruit Bat, is a species of megabat in the family Pteropodidae. It roosts in groups, within caves and tree hollows.

Distribution and status
The bat is endemic to the Louisiade Archipelago, D'Entrecasteaux Islands archipelago, and Trobriand Islands, within Milne Bay Province of southeastern Papua New Guinea.

It has been recorded from Fergusson Island, Goodenough Island, Normanby Island, Misima Island, Panaeati Island, Rossel Island, Tagula Island (Sudest island), Kiriwina island, and Woodlark Islands.

It is listed on the IUCN Red List as a Near threatened species.

See also

References

Dobsonia
Bats of Oceania
Endemic fauna of Papua New Guinea
Mammals of Papua New Guinea
D'Entrecasteaux Islands
Louisiade Archipelago
Milne Bay Province
Trobriand Islands
Near threatened biota of Oceania
Mammals described in 1905
Taxonomy articles created by Polbot
Taxa named by Charles Walter De Vis
Bats of New Guinea